Jan Hochscheidt (born 4 October 1987) is a German professional footballer who plays as a midfielder.

Career
After starting his senior career in the reserve side of Energie Cottbus, Hochscheidt moved to Erzgebirge Aue in 2008, where he made his professional debut. After the 2012–13 2. Bundesliga season he transferred to Bundesliga side Eintracht Braunschweig.

In May 2018, FC Erzgebirge Aue announced Hochscheidt would return to the club for the 2018–19 season having agreed a contract until 2021. On 20 December 2019, he extended his contract with Aue until 2023.

References

External links

1987 births
Living people
Sportspeople from Trier
German footballers
Association football midfielders
Bundesliga players
2. Bundesliga players
3. Liga players
Hertha Zehlendorf players
1. FC Union Berlin players
FC Energie Cottbus II players
FC Erzgebirge Aue players
Eintracht Braunschweig players
Footballers from Rhineland-Palatinate